The E 371 is part of the United Nations international E-road network.

Route 
 
 : Radom – Iłża – Ostrowiec Świętokrzyski – Opatów – Tarnobrzeg – Rzeszów
 : Rzeszów
 : Rzeszów
 : Rzeszów – Miejsce Piastowe – Barwinek
 
 : Vyšný Komárnik – Svidník – Giraltovce – Lipníky
 : Lipníky – Prešov

References

External links 
 UN Economic Commission for Europe: Overall Map of E-road Network (2007)

International E-road network
Roads in Poland
Roads in Slovakia